Yegor Konstantinovich Baburin (born 9 August 1993) is a Russian professional football goalkeeper who plays for Torpedo Moscow on loan from Rostov.

Club career
He made his debut in the Russian Premier League on 17 March 2013 for Zenit St. Petersburg in a game against FC Mordovia Saransk. First choice Zenit goalkeeper Vyacheslav Malafeev was injured before the game. Baburin entered the pitch after 10 minutes of play when Yuri Zhevnov who started the game picked up the muscle strain.

On 1 August 2018, he extended his contract with Zenit for 3 additional seasons. On 29 August 2018, he joined FC Rubin Kazan on loan for the 2018–19 season.

On 12 July 2019, he signed a 4-year contract with FC Rostov.

On 25 February 2021, he moved to Russian club FC Krasnodar, on a loan deal until the end of the season. On 16 July 2022, Baburin joined FC Torpedo Moscow on loan.

Honours
Zenit Saint Petersburg
 Russian Football Premier League: 2014–15
 Russian Cup: 2015–16

Career statistics

References

External links
 

1993 births
Footballers from Chernihiv
Living people
Russian footballers
Russia youth international footballers
Russia under-21 international footballers
Association football goalkeepers
FC Zenit Saint Petersburg players
FC Zenit-2 Saint Petersburg players
FC Rubin Kazan players
FC Rostov players
FC Krasnodar players
FC Torpedo Moscow players
Russian Premier League players
Russian First League players
Russian Second League players